The Absent's Prayer (Arabic: صلاة الغيب, French: La prière de l'absent) is a 1995 Moroccan film. It is an adaptation by director Hamid Bénani, of the novel of the same name by Tahar Ben Jelloun.

Synopsis 
After having lived an idle life devoted to literary passions, and following serious emotional and family conflicts, Mokhtar, who has become amnesiac, undertakes an initiatory journey to Morocco during which he rediscovers the character of his past and his entire memory.

Cast 

 Hamid Basket
 Saâdia Azagoun
 Abdelkebir Rguegda
 Khadija Farahi
 Ahmed Tayeb Laalej
 Tayeb Saddiki

References

External links 
 

Moroccan drama films
1990s Arabic-language films
1995 films